Khushka, kuska, or Khusqa is a rice dish of primarily South Asian origin made with spices, rice (usually basmati) and ghee. It's a lunch dish, primarily served with Kurma or Korma and is very popular in Southern India.

Ingredients 
The spices and condiments used in Khushka may include but are not limited to: cardamom, cinnamon, bay leaves, coriander and mint leaves, apart from ghee, ginger, onions. 
The dish retains the white color of rice even with the light seasoning with spices. 
The dish is served with korma, curry, dahi chutney or Raita.

See also 
 Biryani 
 Hyderabadi Biryani 
 Buhari Biryani (Madras)
 Pullao
 Fried Rice

External links 

 Kuska Recipe

Pakistani rice dishes
South Indian cuisine
Indian rice dishes
Lunch dishes